The 1016 Class consisted of sixty double framed  locomotives designed by George Armstrong and built at the Wolverhampton Works of the Great Western Railway between 1867 and 1871. Like the earlier 302 Class of Joseph Armstrong, the 1016s had  wheels and a  wheelbase, dimensions that would remain traditional for the larger GWR pannier tanks right through to Charles Collett's 5700 Class, and with little change to Frederick Hawksworth's 9400 Class of 1947.

Construction
The 1016 Class consisted of 60 engines and was built in five lots:
 Nos. 1016–1027 (Lot B, 1867)
 Nos. 1028–1039 (Lot C, 1867-8)
 Nos. 1040–1051 (Lot J, 1870)
 Nos. 1052–1063 (Lot K, 1870-1)
 Nos. 1064–1075 (Lot L, 1871)

Design and modifications
The class originally had very short saddle tanks. They were a Wolverhampton version of the Standard Goods class, which they resembled below the running plate. Most reboilering was done at Swindon rather than Wolverhampton, and with new boilers new, full-length tanks were fitted. From 1911 all but 11 of the class were rebuilt with pannier tanks, at the time that Belpaire fireboxes were fitted. After 1922 heavier boilers were used, and pressure increased. Many had new bunkers, of both Swindon and Wolverhampton design.

Use
These engines were distributed between the Northern and Southern Divisions of the GWR. Apart from four scrapped before 1914 all ran well over a million miles; No. 1047, aged 65, was the last survivor, in summer 1935.

Notes

References

External links
 No. 1047 at Birmingham Snow Hill Station in 1912

1016
Railway locomotives introduced in 1867
0-6-0ST locomotives
0-6-0PT locomotives
Scrapped locomotives
Standard gauge steam locomotives of Great Britain